Statistics of Bahraini Premier League in the 1982–83 season.

Overview
Muharraq Club won the championship.

References
RSSSF

Bahraini Premier League seasons
Bah
1982–83 in Bahraini football